Beryl Fleur Karney (31 December 1930 – 11 October 2022), also known as Beryl Goldwyn, was an English ballet dancer.

Born near London, she started dancing at the age of three. She attended the Royal Ballet School and performed with the Royal Ballet in The Sleeping Princess (The Sleeping Beauty), with Dame Margot Fonteyn, when the Royal Opera House reopened after the World War II in 1946.

Goldwyn danced with the Anglo Polish Ballet in 1949, and she joined the Ballet Rambert in 1950, later becoming its prima ballerina.Goldwyn danced numerous roles, including Les Sylphides, The Nutcracker, Gala Performance, and The Sleeping Beauty, but her most celebrated was the part of Giselle. She performed in the UK, Ireland, France, Germany, Italy, and the United States, and at the Baalbek festival in Lebanon, where she shared the programme with the Lebanese singer Fairuz. In 1996–97, she performed again with the Royal Ballet at the Royal Opera House in Don Quixote, with Sylvie Guillem, fifty years after her first performance there.

For the 90th birthday celebrations of the Ballet Rambert, she took part in the "Rambert at 90 Oral History Project".

Personal life and death
In 1969, she married scientist, engineer and businessman Andrew Karney; their son Peter was born in 1972. Goldwyn died of cancer on 11 October 2022, at the age of 91.

References

External links
Beryl Goldwyn Karney

1930 births
2022 deaths
English ballerinas
People educated at the Royal Ballet School
Prima ballerinas
Rambert Dance Company dancers